The election for Resident Commissioner to the United States House of Representatives took place on November 4, 2008, the same day as the larger Puerto Rican general election and the United States elections, 2008.

Background 
The incumbent one-term Resident Commissioner (same as non-voting territorial delegate) Luis Fortuño, of the (NPP/R), was retiring from his House seat to run for Governor of Puerto Rico.

Pedro Pierluisi (NPP), the former Puerto Rican Secretary of Justice under former Governor Pedro Rosselló, was the favorite to succeed Fortuño over economist Alfredo Salazar (PDP).

Regardless of which of the two men won, the seat would switch from Republican to Democratic hands in January as both candidates would caucuses with the Democrats. However, this seat would not have impacted which party controls the chamber.

Candidates for Resident Commissioner
 Jessica Martínez Birriel for the Puerto Rican Independence Party
 Pedro Pierluisi for the New Progressive Party
 Alfredo Salazar for the Popular Democratic Party
 Carlos Alberto Velázquez López for the Puerto Ricans for Puerto Rico Party

Election results

See also 
Puerto Rican general election, 2008
 

2. Pierluisi is leading Salazar 51% to 34% as of October 30, 2008. https://web.archive.org/web/20081102101723/http://www.vocero.com/noticia-5761-slido_fortuo.html

References

United States House of Representatives
Puerto Rico
2008